Vadrangi is a community in Andhra Pradesh, Telangana in India. They were part of Viswabrahmin group. Their traditional profession is carpentry. They are classified as Backward Class according to Reservation in the government.

See also
 Telugu castes

References

Social groups of Andhra Pradesh
Social groups of Telangana